Dhamaal is an Indian comedy film series directed and co-produced by Indra Kumar. It stars Ritesh Deshmukh, Arshad Warsi, Javed Jaffrey and Sanjay Dutt in lead roles.Dhamaal was released on 7 September 2007 and its also spawned two direct sequels Double Dhamaal (2011) and then a reboot Total Dhamaal (2019).

Overview

Dhamaal (2007)

Four lazy friends named Roy, Manav, Aditya and Boman venture out on a race to find a hidden treasure in Goa. However, Inspector Kabir soon learns about their plan and sets out on their trail.

Double Dhamaal: 420s (2011)

Four idlers make elaborate plans to earn money by investing in buildings but are conned by Kabir, who leaves them unemployed and penniless. Soon, they are on the prowl to avenge their humiliation.

Total Dhamaal (2019)

When a plane carrying a thief's treasure crashes in Janakpur, a group of eccentric people and seasoned con artists compete against each other to find it first.

Films

Dhamaal

The first installment of the series, centers on the fictional incidents. The film stars Sanjay Dutt, Ritesh Deshmukh, Arshad Warsi, Aashish Chaudhary and Javed Jaffrey while Asrani, Sanjay Mishra, Vijay Raaz, Manoj Pahwa, Tiku Talsania and Prem Chopra are featured in supporting roles. It is heavily inspired from the 2001 American comedy film Rat Race directed by Jerry Zucker. Dhamaal was released on 7 September 2007, and gained positive reviews. It earned  worldwide The film was declared as a box-office success.

Double Dhamaal: 420s

After the success of Dhamaal Indra and Sanjay Re-unite once again for sequel. The film was titled as Dhamaal 2: 420s, but then changed to Double Dhamaal and also second installment in this series. The plot focused on Four idlers make elaborate plans to earn money by investing in buildings but are conned by Kabir, who leaves them unemployed and penniless. Soon, they are on the prowl to avenge their humiliation. Dhamaal 2 was released on 24 June 2011, and received mixed to negative reviews from critics upon release. Review aggregator Rotten Tomatoes gave it a 20% rotten rating. Mayank Shekhar of the Hindustan Times rated the film with 1 out of 5 stars. According to Box Office India, the film had a good opening of 60 - 70% collections. At a few multiplexes, such as, Spice Noida, E Square Pune and Wave Ludhiana, the film almost opened at a 100% response. The film collected approximately 76.1 million net on its first day, according to Box Office India. The movie grossed 700 million worldwide. Box Office India finally declared it a "Average". The movie was remade in Tamil in 2000 as Sudhandhiram.

Total Dhammal

A sequel, Total Dhamaal, was commissioned after the release of the previous film and was also directed by Indra, with both Riteish Deshmukh and Jaaved Jaaferi reprising their roles and Ajay Devgn , Anil Kapoor and Madhuri Dixit were new additions in cast playing leading roles. Sanjay Dutt and some other actors which were in the previous two parts were not in this third installment.

The film focused on When a plane carrying a thief's treasure crashes in Janakpur, a group of eccentric people and seasoned con artists compete against each other to find it first. Total Dhamaal was released on 22 February 2019, and gained positive reviews. Himesh Mankad from Koimoi gives 3 star out of 5 says "Total Dhamaal is a fair clean entertainer that can be enjoyed with the entire family. It's definitely an improvement over previous installment Double Dhamaal". In opening week the film grossed . In 12 days of its release the film crossed  mark in gross collection. On 20 April 2019, the film was released on Disney+ Hotstar. The DVD was also released in August 2019 by Shemaroo.

Full On Dhamaal (TBA)

After the trailer release of Total Dhamaal, in an interview, director Indra Kumar said that another Dhamaal sequel is planned. The fourth film along with Sunny Deol, Ajay Devgn , Riteish Deshmukh, Arshad Warsi and Javed Jaffrey .

Cast and characters
This table lists the main characters who appear in the Dhamaal Franchise.A dark grey cell indicates the character was not in the film.

Additional crew and production details

Release and revenue

References

External links

See also
YRF Spy Universe

2010s Hindi-language films
Indian film series
Comedy film series
2000s Hindi-language films